The Port Pirie Regional Council (PPRC) is a local government area in South Australia, focused on the city of Port Pirie. It has a population of about 18,000 people. The council's main administrative facilities and works depot can be found in Port Pirie; it also have a rural office in Crystal Brook. In addition to Port Pirie, the municipality also includes the surrounding towns and localities of Bungama, Collinsfield, Coonamia, Crystal Brook, Koolunga, Lower Broughton, Merriton, Napperby, Nelshaby, Pirie East, Port Davis, Port Pirie South, Port Pirie West, Redhill, Risdon Park, Risdon Park South, Solomontown, Wandearah East, Wandearah West and Warnertown, and part of Clements Gap,  and Mundoora.

The Port Pirie Regional Council was created in 1997, and resulted from two council mergers in short succession: the amalgamation of the District Council of Pirie into the City of Port Pirie in July 1996, and that council's subsequent amalgamation with the District Council of Crystal Brook-Redhill to create the present council in March 1997.

Councillors

The Port Pirie Regional Council has a directly-elected mayor.

Mayors of the Port Pirie Regional Council

Kenneth Francis Madigan (1997-2003) 
 Geoff Brock (2003-2009) 
 Brenton Vanstone (2009-2014) 
 John Rohde (2014-2018) 
Leon Stephens (2018-Present)

References

External links
Port Pirie Regional Council

Local government areas of South Australia
Port Pirie